Chewingum is a 1984 Italian teen comedy film directed by Biagio Proietti. It premiered at the 41st Venice International Film Festival in the "De Sica" section.

Cast
 
 Massimo Ciavarro: Massimo 
 Isabella Ferrari: Isabella 
 Mauro Di Francesco: Mauro 
 Mara Venier:  Emanuela Raveggi
 Orsetta Gregoretti: Orsetta  
 Marina Occhiena: Marina
 Anna Melato: Mother of Orsetta

References

External links
 

1984 films
Italian comedy films
1980s Italian-language films
1980s teen comedy films
1984 comedy films
1980s Italian films